Adolfo Donayre (10 August 1933 – 27 March 2011) was a Peruvian footballer. He played in six matches for the Peru national football team in 1963. He was also part of Peru's squad for the 1963 South American Championship.

References

External links
 

1933 births
2011 deaths
Peruvian footballers
Peru international footballers
Association football defenders
People from Ica, Peru